is a 1973 Japanese martial arts film starring Sonny Chiba. It is based on an action manga by Ikki Kajiwara.

A recut version was released in the United States in 1976 as The Bodyguard, with added footage in the first ten minutes of the film.

Bodyguard Kiba was followed by the sequel Bodigaado Kiba: Hissatsu sankaku tobi, released later that same year. There were then three more film adaptations with Takeshi Yamato in the role of Kiba released in 1993, 1994, and 1995 by Takashi Miike at the beginning of his career.

Plot summary
"Karate master and anti-drug vigilante Chiba returns to his home in Japan, where he holds a press conference announcing his intention to wipe out the nation's drug industry. He also offers his services as a bodyguard to anyone who is willing to come forward and provide information about the drug lords' activities. He is soon approached by a mysterious woman claiming to have important information and asking for Chiba's protection. She seems to be legitimate, but is she really what she appears to be?"

Home media
On November 20, 2007, BCI Eclipse released the film in their Sonny Chiba Collection DVD set, which also includes Golgo 13: Assignment Kowloon, The Bullet Train, Dragon Princess, Karate Warriors, and Sister Street Fighter.

Sequel
Director Ryuichi Takamori released a sequel, Bodigaado Kiba: Hissatsu sankaku tobi, later that same year on October 13, 1973. The sequel also starred Sonny Chiba as Kiba Naoto.

In popular culture
The American version of the film opens with a quotation:

An altered version of the same passage (substituting "Chiba the bodyguard" with "the Lord"), complete with erroneous attribution to Ezekiel by the character of Jules Winnfield (Samuel L. Jackson), appears in Quentin Tarantino's 1994 film Pulp Fiction.

References

External links
 
 

1973 films
Japanese martial arts films
Karate films
1973 martial arts films
Films about bodyguards
Mafia films
Films about the illegal drug trade
Films about organized crime in Japan
1970s Japanese films